Viking was Sweden's first satellite. It was launched on an Ariane 1 rocket as a piggyback payload together with the French satellite SPOT 1, on February 22, 1986. Operations ended on May 12, 1987. Viking was used to explore plasma processes in the magnetosphere and the ionosphere.

Spacecraft
Space was limited underneath the SPOT 1 satellite, and Viking had to be quite sturdy in order to withstand the stress of launch. The basic shape of the Swedish satellite was a flat octagonal disc, 0.5 metres thick and 1.9 metres across. The mechanical interface of the payload adapter from the Ariane rocket was duplicated on top of Viking. This enabled it to be added to the launch with a minimum of redesign of the SPOT satellite. The satellite was developed by SAAB Space with Boeing Aerospace as a major subcontractor. 

The launch sequence was designed to enable Viking to separate and fire its own rocket engine to be sent into its proper polar orbit after separation of the SPOT 1 satellite from the adapter interface.

Mission

The satellite hosted five sensors and/or experiments: Electric Fields (V1); Magnetic Fields (V2); Hot Plasma Particles (V3); Waves (V4), and an Auroral Imager (V5).

Once in orbit, 4 wire segments of 40 metre length each were spooled out in a radial direction from the edge of the spinning satellite disc. Also, 2 stiff rods of 4 metre length were extended in the axial direction. A sensor pod was stationed at the end of each of these, forming three orthogonal pairs. Together they could measure the electric field of the earth in all three dimensions. Stiff booms were also extended for other types of sensors and antennas.
In addition, the satellite included two 4 meter long axial booms that hosted the V1 and V4 experiments. Two short radial booms hosted the V2 and V4 sensors.

The mission produced a large amount of extremely useful scientific data, and was deemed a great success.  An initial discussion of what scientists learned from these measurements, which included "global distribution of magnetosphere-ionosphere interaction; auroral morphology and substorm dynamics; heating and expulsion of ionospheric plasma into the magnetosphere; field aligned acceleration into the ionosphere; and electron and ion wave generation" can be found in the article "Scientific results from the Swedish Viking satellite", 1988 Swedish Inst. of Space Physics, Kiruna.

Post mission
After the scientific mission ended, both Viking and the upper stage of the rocket used to launch the satellite became derelict objects that would continue to orbit Earth for many years.  , both objects remain in orbit.

References

External links

Viking information at NSSDC Master Catalog

Derelict satellites orbiting Earth
Geospace monitoring satellites
Space programme of Sweden
First artificial satellites of a country
Spacecraft launched in 1986